The Western Xia mausoleums occupy an area of some  at the foot of the Helan Mountains in the Ningxia Hui Autonomous Region of northwestern China, and include nine imperial mausoleums and 250 tombs of imperial relatives and officials of China's Western Xia dynasty. This burial complex lies some  westward from capital city of the Western Xia, the Xingqing fu or Xingqing, what is modern-day Yinchuan, capital of the Ningxia Hui Autonomous Region.

Some  have so far been excavated, and efforts are underway to secure and preserve the remains of this poorly understood era.

History
The Western Xia dynasty, existed between 1038 and 1227, when it was conquered by the Mongols under Genghis Khan. The empire was founded by the Tangut ethnic group, about which little is currently known. Of current excavations, only the No.3 mausoleum has been adequately excavated and researched. This mausoleum is attributed to Western Xia's first emperor Jingzong, born Li Yuanhao, (1003–1048), has been determined as a pavilion-tower construction fusing both traditional mausoleum and temple styles with Buddhist characteristics.

The Western Xia capital city and the burial complex eluded early 20th century explorers of Central Asia, including Pyotr Kozlov, Aurel Stein and Sven Hedin. During modern times, it was first reported by Wulf-Dieter Graf zu Castell, who recorded the site in an aerial photograph, published in 1938 in his book Chinaflug.

Imperial mausoleums

The area occupied by the Western Xia tombs runs from south-west to north-east along the eastern edge of the Helan Mountains, and is about 12 km in length, and up to 2.5 km in width. The nine imperial mausoleums are arrayed from south to north over a distance of about 10 km, with the earliest emperors buried at the south, and the later emperors buried towards the north.

Each mausoleum has a similar layout (see plan of Mausoleum 2 below), in general comprising a rectangular outer enclosing wall (waicheng 外城), with a pair of gate towers (quetai 鵲臺) at the south end, then one or more pavilions (usually a pair) housing memorial steles (beiting 碑亭), then a rectangular barbican (yuecheng 月城) in front of the entrance to a square or rectangular inner enclosure (lingcheng 陵城), with watch towers (jiaoque 角闕) at the four corners. The solid tomb mound built over the site of the burial is constructed from rammed earth. It is positioned off-centre, in the north-west part of the inner enclosure, and is up to 30 metres across and 23 metres in height. There are holes in the tomb mounds that would have originally supported woooden beams, and as very large numbers of tiles have been found in each mausoleum, it is believed that the surviving mounds are the cores for a more substantial architectural monument, coated with bricks and with tiled eaves and decorative sculptures at each level.

Mausoleums 1 and 2 are situated close together at the southern tip of the tomb complex, and are the two largest tombs, with their outer enclosure both measuring 340 × 224 metres. These two are believed to be occupied by the grandfather (Li Jiqian) and father (Li Deming) of Li Yuanhao, the first Emperor of the Western Xia.

Mausoleums 3 and 4 are about 4 km further north, with Mausoleum 3 at the eastern edge of the tomb area, and Mausoleum 4 situated about 2 km to the west, close to the side of the mountains. It is believed that Mausoleum 3 is occupied by Emperor Jingzong (1st emperor, reigned 1038–1048) and Mausoleum 4 is occupied by Emperor Yizong (2nd emperor, reigned 1048–1068).

About 2 km further north are Mausoleums 5 and 6, which are believed to be occupied by Emperors Huizong (3rd emperor, reigned 1068–1086) and Chongzong (4th emperor, reigned 1086–1139) respectively.

About 3 km further north are a group of three mausoleums for Emperors Renzong (5th emperor, reigned 1139–1193), Huanzong (6th emperor, reigned 1193–1206), and Xiangzong (7th emperor, reigned 1206–1211). This area was developed for industrial use during the 1970s, and part of Mausoleum 7 and most of Mausoleums 8 and 9 were built over, although the tomb mounds still survive. The buildings from the 1970s have now all been demolished.

There are no mausoleums for the last three Western Xia emperors, Shenzong (8th emperor, reigned 1211–1223), Xianzong (9th emperor, reigned 1223–1226), and Modi (last emperor, reigned 1226–1227), probably because the Western Xia empire was destroyed by the Mongols before there was time to build their tombs. However, it has been suggested that Tomb 161, which is the largest other tomb in the tomb complex (165 metres long and 100 metres wide) is the joint imperial tomb for Emperors Shenzong and Xianzong. This tomb is situated about 200 metres south-west of Mausoleum 6 (for Emperor Chongzong), and although it is large compared with the other ordinary tombs, it is still smaller than the imperial mausoleums, and does not share the same complex layout as the imperial mausoleums. If Shenzong and Xianzong are buried in Tomb 161, then it would be the only mausoleum that does not follow the south-to-north order.

Footnotes

Western Xia architecture
Mausoleums in China
National archaeological parks of China
Major National Historical and Cultural Sites in Ningxia
Yinchuan